Wicked Woman is a 1953 American film noir film starring Beverly Michaels, Richard Egan, Percy Helton, and Evelyn Scott.  Directed by Russell Rouse, the film was written by Rouse and Clarence Greene.

Plot
An attractive blonde drifter (Beverly Michaels) arrives in town on a bus and gets a job as a waitress at a local bar. She sets her sights on the bar's handsome owner (Richard Egan), who is married to an alcoholic waitress there, (Evelyn Scott), who inherited the lounge from her father. Michaels seduces Egan and schemes for the pair to sell the bar without the wife's knowledge and skip to Mexico together. Before they can a boarder at the rooming house where Michaels is staying that she had enticed then jilted, (Percy Helton), discovers her plans and attempts blackmail.

Cast
 Beverly Michaels  as Billie Nash
 Richard Egan as Matt Bannister
 Percy Helton as Charlie Borg
 Evelyn Scott as Dora Bannister
 Robert Osterloh as Larry Lowry
 Frank Ferguson as Bill Porter
 Bernadene Hayes as Mrs. Walters

Production
The low-budget film, produced under the working title of Free and Easy, was the first leading role for Richard Egan.

Reception
A contemporary review in The New York Times called the film a "misguided little melodrama" that "manages to squander some persuasively realistic upholstery".

In 2004 The Village Voice praised her performance as "wonderfully lurid," and included the movie in a list of the 25 most memorable cult films.

References

External links
 
 
 
 
Wicked Woman at Trailers from Hell

1953 films
1953 crime films
1950s English-language films
American black-and-white films
American crime films
Film noir
Films directed by Russell Rouse
Films produced by Edward Small
Films scored by Buddy Baker (composer)
United Artists films
1950s American films